Robert John Taylor (1881 – 19 July 1954) was a British Labour Party politician.

Born in Blyth, Northumberland, Taylor became a coal miner and then a checkweighman.  He became active in the Labour Party, serving on Blyth Council from 1935 until 1938, and also on Northumberland County Council.

He was elected at the 1935 general election as Member of Parliament (MP) for the Morpeth constituency in Northumberland, and held the seat until his death in 1954, aged 73.

In Clement Attlee's post-war Labour Government, he was a Lord of the Treasury from 1945 to 1951, serving as Deputy Chief Whip from 1946. After Labour's defeat at the 1951 general election, he was appointed in 1952 as a Privy Counsellor.

References

External links 
 

1881 births
1954 deaths
Councillors in Northumberland
Labour Party (UK) councillors
Labour Party (UK) MPs for English constituencies
Members of the Privy Council of the United Kingdom
Miners' Federation of Great Britain-sponsored MPs
National Union of Mineworkers-sponsored MPs
People from Blyth, Northumberland
UK MPs 1935–1945
UK MPs 1945–1950
UK MPs 1950–1951
UK MPs 1951–1955
Ministers in the Attlee governments, 1945–1951